Kilbrennan is a townland in County Westmeath, Ireland. The townland is located in the civil parish Castlelost. The N52 is to the west of the area, connecting the towns of Mullingar and Tyrrellspass.

References 

Townlands of County Westmeath